Charley's (Big-Hearted) Aunt is a 1940 British comedy film directed by Walter Forde, starring Arthur Askey and Richard Murdoch as Oxford 'scholars'.

The film is one of many to be based on the 1892 Victorian farce Charley's Aunt by Brandon Thomas. Arthur Askey's professional nickname was "Big-Hearted Arthur", which was added to the title to distinguish it from Jack Benny's version, for its (limited) American release.

Plot
Oxford students Arthur (Arthur Askey), Stinker (Richard Murdoch), and Albert (Graham Moffatt) are in danger of being "sent down" (expelled) for bad behaviour. Learning that the Dean of Bowgate College is an amateur Egyptologist, Arthur—who had just played the lead in a stage version of Charley's Aunt—poses as Albert's wealthy Aunt Lucy, who might finance an archeological expedition if the Dean is lenient on her nephew and his friends. Unfortunately, the real Aunt Lucy picks this day to pay a visit to Oxford herself, with calamitous consequences.

Differences from play
Aside from the Oxford setting and the premise of a male student impersonating his wealthy aunt, the film bears little resemblance to the original play. In one brief sequence, the play Charley's Aunt is shown being performed by the Oxford students.

Cast
Arthur Askey as Arthur Linden-Jones
Richard Murdoch as "Stinker" Burton
Graham Moffatt as Albert Brown
Moore Marriott as Jerry
J. H. Roberts as Dean of Bowgate
Felix Aylmer as The Proctor
Wally Patch as The Buller
Leonard Sharp as Buller's assistant
Phyllis Calvert as Betty Forsythe
Jeanne de Casalis as Aunt Lucy
Elliott Mason as Dame Luckton

Critical reception
 TV Guide wrote that "Brandon Thomas's oft-filmed farce (at least seven times since 1925) has frequently been better, but Askey gives it a good shot."
 Sky Movies wrote that it is "tailored to the talents of the two stars, on the strength of their great success in the hit radio series Band Waggon. Those stalwarts of the British comedy film, 1935–45, plump Graham Moffatt and doddery Moore Marriott, are on hand to add to the fun, and the heroine is Phyllis Calvert, who was appearing in her second film."

References

External links
 

1940 films
1940 comedy films
British black-and-white films
British films based on plays
Films based on Charley's Aunt
British comedy films
Films directed by Walter Forde
Films with screenplays by Marriott Edgar
1940s English-language films
1940s British films